This is an incomplete list of Australian National University people, including alumni and staff.

Alumni

Academia

Robert Addo-Fening, historian and academic
Des Ball, security specialist and ANU Professor
Andrew Barker, British classicist
Joanna Bourke, historian and academic
Rosi Braidotti, feminist
Bob Brissenden, poet, novelist, critic and academic
Harold Brookfield, academic
Verity Burgmann, academic
Dipesh Chakrabarty, historian and theorist
Yang Hi Choe-Wall, Koreanist
Peter Coutts, archaeologist
Glyn Davis, Vice-Chancellor of the University of Melbourne since 2005
John Deeble, Architect of Medicare
Peter Drysdale, economist
Alan Dupont, academic
Stevan Eldred-Grigg, historian and novelist
Nicholas Evans, linguist
Alan Finkel, historian
John Frow, academic
Bill Gammage, historian
Ross Garnaut, economist
Geoffrey Garrett, political scientist, dean of the Wharton School of the University of Pennsylvania
Alan Gilbert, Vice Chancellor of the University of Melbourne 1996–2004; Vice Chancellor of the University of Manchester 2004–2010
Malcolm Gillies, Vice-Chancellor of London Metropolitan University
Nicholas Gruen, economist
William Hale, academic
Allan Hawke, diplomat and ANU Chancellor
Chris Heyde, probabilist
Brij Lal, historian
Marcia Langton, anthropologist (BA, ANU), geographer (PhD, Maquarie)
Donald Laycock, linguist
Michael McRobbie, President of Indiana University
Toby Miller, academic
David Nash, linguist
Harjot Oberoi, academic
Patrick O'Farrell, historian
Diane Pearson, Professor in Environmental Management
John Quiggin, economist
Margaret Reeson, historian
Ralph Regenvanu, anthropologist, artist and politician
Elizabeth Anne Reid, academic
Leslie Lloyd Robson, historian
Michael Roe, historian
Jessa Rogers, Aboriginal educator
Leonie Sandercock, academic
Carmel Schrire, anthropologist
Bernard Smith, art historian
Clem Tisdell, economist
Hrvoje Tkalčić, geophysicist
Donald Tuzin, social anthropologist
Tarisi Vunidilo, Fijian archaeologist and curator
Rolf Zinkernagel, Nobel Prize winning medical researcher

Business

John Bryant, CEO of Kellogg's
Cheong Choong Kong, former CEO of Singapore Airlines and current Chairman of OCBC Bank
Swarnim Wagle, Economist from Nepal, worked in World Bank and Asian Development Bank, former vice chairman of National Planning Commission of Nepal
Chris Corrigan, former CEO of Patrick Corporation and current Chairman of Qube Holdings

Government

Politicians

Prime Ministers of Australia
Bob Hawke, Prime Minister of Australia 1983–1991 (attended but did not graduate)
Kevin Rudd, Prime Minister of Australia 2007–2010, 2013

Other federal politicians

Phil Barresi, Member of the Australian House of Representatives 1996–2007
Kim Beazley Sr, Member of the Australian House of Representatives 1945–1977; Federal Minister 1972–1975
Bob Catley, Member of the Australian House of Representatives 1990–1993
Barry Cohen, Member of the Australian House of Representatives 1969–1990
Stephen Conroy, Member of the Australian Senate since 2006; Federal Minister 2007–2013
Craig Emerson, Member of the Australian House of Representatives since 1998; Federal Minister 2007–2013
Chris Gallus, Member of the Australian House of Representatives 1990–2004
Concetta Fierravanti-Wells, Member of the Australian Senate since 2005
Peter Garrett, Member of the Australian House of Representatives since 2004; Federal Minister 2007–2013
Gary Gray, Member of the Australian House of Representatives since 2007; Federal Minister since 2010–2013
Alan Griffin, Member of the Australian House of Representatives since 1993; Federal Minister 2007–2010
Dame Margaret Guilfoyle, Member of the Australian Senate 1971–1987
Harry Jenkins, Member of the Australian House of Representatives since 1986; Speaker of the House 2008–2011
Michael Keenan, Member of the Australian House of Representatives since 2004
John Kerin, Member of the Australian House of Representatives 1972–1993; Federal Minister 1983–1993
Catherine King, Member of the Australian House of Representatives since 2001; Federal Minister 2013
Joe Ludwig, Member of the Australian Senate since 1999; Federal Minister 2007–2013
Brett Mason, Member of the Australian Senate since 1999
Nick Minchin, Member of the Australian Senate 1993–2011; Federal Minister 1997–2007
Susan Ryan, Member of the Australian Senate 1975–1988
Zed Seselja, Member of the Australian Senate since 2013
Warwick Smith, Member of the Australian House of Representatives 1984–1998; Federal Minister 1996–1998
Warren Snowdon, Member of the Australian House of Representatives since 1987; Federal Minister 2007–2013
Alex Somlyay, Member of the Australian House of Representatives 1990–2013; Federal Minister 1997–1998
Peter White, Member of the Australian House of Representatives 1981–1990

State Premiers and territory Chief Ministers

State Premiers
Jeff Kennett, Premier of Victoria 1992–1999 (attended but did not graduate)
Barry O'Farrell, Premier of New South Wales 2011–2014

Territory Chief Ministers
Andrew Barr, Chief Minister of the Australian Capital Territory since 2014
Katy Gallagher, Chief Minister of the Australian Capital Territory 2011–2014
Gary Humphries, Chief Minister of the Australian Capital Territory 2000–2001
Jon Stanhope, Chief Minister of the Australian Capital Territory 2001–2011
Shane Stone, Chief Minister of the Northern Territory 1995–1999

Other State and territory politicians

Michael Pettersson, Member of the Australian Capital Territory Legislative Assembly since 2016
Alistair Coe, Member of the Australian Capital Territory Legislative Assembly since 2008
Roslyn Dundas, Member of the Australian Capital Territory Legislative Assembly 2001–2004
John Hannaford, Member of the New South Wales Legislative Council 1984–2000; State Minister 1990–1995
Kate Jones, Member of the Legislative Assembly of Queensland 2007–2012; State Minister 2009–2011
Andrew McIntosh, Member of the Victorian Legislative Assembly since 1999
Michael Moore, Member of the Australian Capital Territory Legislative Assembly 1989–2001
Shane Rattenbury, Member of the Australian Capital Territory Legislative Assembly since 2008; Speaker of the Assembly 2008–2012
Chris Steel, Member of the Australian Capital Territory Legislative Assembly since 2016
Zed Seselja, Member of the Australian Capital Territory Legislative Assembly since 2004; Leader of the Opposition 2007–2013 
Andrew Tink, Member of the New South Wales Legislative Council 1988–2007
Michael Yabsley, Member of the New South Wales Legislative Council 1984–1994; State Minister 1988–1992

Civil servants

Glenys Beauchamp, Secretary of the Department of Industry since 2013
Peter Boxall, Secretary of the Department of Finance 1997–2002
Stephen Brady, Official Secretary to the Governor-General of Australia since 2008
Blair Comley, Secretary of the Department of Climate Change and Energy Efficiency 2011–2013
Peta Credlin, Chief of Staff to Prime Minister Tony Abbott 2013–2015
Gordon de Brouwer, Secretary of the Department of the Environment since 2013
Paul Dibb, Director of the Joint Intelligence Organisation 1986–1988 and Deputy Secretary for Strategy and Intelligence of the Department of Defence 1988–1991
Bernie Fraser, Secretary of the Australian Treasury 1984–1989
Paul Grimes, Secretary of the Department of Agriculture since 2013
Jane Halton, Secretary of the Department of Health (Australia) since 2001
Stuart Hamilton, Secretary of the Department of Environment 1993–1996
Allan Hawke, Secretary of the Department of Defence 1999–2002
Michael Keating, Secretary of the Department of the Prime Minister & Cabinet 1991–1996
Renée Leon, Secretary of the Department of Employment since 2013
Bill McLennan, Head of the Australian Bureau of Statistics 1995–2000
Simon Overland, Chief Commissioner of Victoria Police 2009–2011
Martin Parkinson, Secretary of the Australian Treasury 2011–2014
Lisa Paul, Secretary of the Department of Education (Australia) since 2004
Finn Pratt, Secretary of the Department of Social Services since 2009
Don Russell, Secretary of the Department of Industry 2011–2013
Patricia Scott, Secretary of the Department of Communications 2007–2009
Rod Sims, Chairman of the Australian Competition & Consumer Commission
Dennis Trewin, Head of the Australian Bureau of Statistics 2000–2007
Nick Warner, Director-General of the Australian Secret Intelligence Service

Diplomats

Richard Butler, Permanent Representative of Australia to the United Nations 1992–1996
Iftekhar Ahmed Chowdhury, Bangladeshi Ambassador to the United Nations 2001–2007; Foreign Minister (2007–2009); Principal Research Fellow, Institute of South Asian Studies [ISAS], National University of Singapore
Martin Indyk, United States Ambassador to Israel 1995–1997 and 2000–2001
Sione Ngongo Kioa, Tongan Ambassador to 10 countries
Cristelle Pratt, Assistant Secretary-General for the Environment and Climate Action, Organisation of African, Caribbean and Pacific States 
Feleti Teo, Secretary General of the Pacific Islands Forum Secretariat 2008
Peter Woolcott, former Australian Ambassador to Italy
Rathakit Manathat, former Thai Ambassador to China

United Nations officials
Robert Piper, Regional Humanitarian Coordinator for the Sahel, with the rank of United Nations Assistant Secretary General; founding member of the Doug Anthony Allstars

Foreign officials

Chirayu Isarangkun Na Ayuthaya, Director of the Crown Property Bureau of Thailand (1987–2018) and the Chief Economic Advisor in the Privy Council of H.M. The King of Thailand (2018–present)
Chatib Basri, Finance Minister in the Indonesian Government 2013–2014
Don Brash, Leader of the Opposition in New Zealand 2003–2006, Governor of the Reserve Bank of New Zealand 1988–2002
Patricia Hewitt, Member of the House of Commons of the United Kingdom 1997–2010; British Minister 2001–2007
Carlos Jarque, Mexican Government Minister 1995–2000
Prince Katsura, Member of the Imperial House of Japan
Gordon Darcy Lilo, Prime Minister of the Solomon Islands since 2011
Marty Natalegawa, Foreign Minister of Indonesia 2009–2014
Mari Pangestu, Minister in the Indonesian Government since 2004
Kuini Speed, Deputy Prime Minister of Fiji 1999–2000
 Teuea Toatu, the Vice-President and Minister for Finance & Economic Development of Kiribati since 2019 and 2016, respectively.
Damdin Tsogtbaatar, Foreign Minister of Mongolia since 2017 
Jian Yang, Member of the House of Representatives of New Zealand since 2011

Law

Justices of the High Court of Australia
Stephen Gageler, Justice of the High Court of Australia since 2012; Solicitor-General of Australia 2008–2012

Judges of the Federal Court of Australia
Tony Whitlam, Judge of the Federal Court of Australia 1993–2005

Judges of the Supreme Courts of Australian states and territories 
Peter Buchanan, Judge of the Supreme Court of Victoria since 1997
Terence Higgins, Chief Justice of the Supreme Court of the Australian Capital Territory since 2003
Catherine Holmes, Judge of the Supreme Court of Queensland since 2000
Geoffrey Nettle, Judge of the Supreme Court of Victoria since 2002
Janine Pritchard, Judge of the Supreme Court of Western Australia since 2010

President of the Chamber of the Supreme Administrative Court of Thailand
Rathakit Manathat, President of the Chamber of the Supreme Administrative Court of Thailand since 2022

Federal Magistrates of Australia
John Pascoe, Chief Federal Magistrate of Australia since 2004

Legal practitioners
Tupou Draunidalo, Fijian Lawyer
Jennifer Robinson, human rights and WikiLeaks lawyer; Rhodes Scholar 2006

Law professors
George Williams, professor at the UNSW Faculty of Law; constitutional law expert

Humanities

Arts

David Bradbury, filmmaker
Michael Brand, art scholar
Ronny Chieng, comedian
Jim Cotter, composer
Jessica Cottis, conductor
Ian Cresswell, composer
Will Firth, translator
Hannah Gadsby, comedian
Alister Grierson, director and scriptwriter
Nagita Slavina, an Indonesian actress
Geoffrey Lancaster, classical pianist and conductor
Henry Nixon, actor
Tim Rogers, musician
Richard Roxburgh, actor
Adam Spreadbury-Maher, theatre director and producer
Katia Tiutiunnik, composer
Sally Whitwell, ARIA Award-winning pianist

 Nimal Perera, Archaeologist, Anthropologist and former deputy director (excavation) in Department of Archaeology, Sri Lanka

Journalism and media
Bettina Arndt, journalist
Cynthia Banham, journalist and academic
Alice T. Days, documentary filmmaker
Toby Hendy, science communicator and YouTuber
Paul McDermott, comedian and television host
Stephen Rice, journalist
Peter Thompson, journalist

Literature, writing and poetry

Don Aitkin, writer
Diane Bell, anthropologist, author
Michael Byrne, poet
Kevin Hart, poet and literary critic
Debra Oswald, scriptwriter
Guy Pearse, author
Gayla Reid, writer
Pierre Ryckmans, writer, translator, sinologist
Brendan Shanahan, author
David Vernon, writer and sceptic
Gerard Windsor, author and literary critic
Vanessa Woods, author
Shahnon Ahmad, prose writer, Malaysian National Laureate

Military
Vice Admiral Ray Griggs, Vice Chief of the Defence Force

Sciences

Astronomy
 Jessie Christiansen, exoplanetologist
 Don VandenBerg, astronomer

Biology
 Nerilie Abram, climate scientist
 Leanne Armand, marine scientist
 Ian Brooker, botanist
 Kirsten Parris, urban ecologist
 Susanne von Caemmerer, plant physiologist

Chemistry
John Shine, biochemist
Roland Stocker, biochemist
G. S. R. Subba Rao, bio-organic chemist

Mathematics
John Coates, mathematician
Michael Cowling, mathematician
Peter Hall, statistician
Adrian Pagan, econometrician
Charles E. M. Pearce, mathematician

Medicine
Colin Butler, physician and humanitarian
Anne Castles, cognitive scientist of reading and language
Sir William Liley, perinatal physiologist
Adrian Liston, immunologist
Rodolfo Llinás, neuroscientist
Robert Webster, virologist

Physics
Rodney Jory, physicist
Ross H. McKenzie, physicist
Keith Nugent, physicist

Sport

William Cheung, kung fu practitioner
David Gallop, CEO of the Football Federation Australia
Lincoln Hall, mountain climber
Tal Karp (born 1981), female Australian football (soccer) player
Stephen Larkham, rugby player, World Cup winner
Tim Macartney-Snape, mountaineer

Other
Brian George Farran, bishop
Bettina Gorton, wife of John Gorton, Prime Minister of Australia (1968–71)
James Popple, CEO of the Law Council of Australia
Naomi Rono, World Bank advisor
Andrew Tridgell, computer programmer
Barbara Vernon, birth activist
Tom Worthington, computer programmer

Faculty
Notable past and current faculty members include:

 
Anthony Irvine Adams, public health physician
Patrick Atiyah, English barrister and legal writer
Arthur Llewellyn Basham, South Asian historian
Michael Barnsley, mathematician and entrepreneur
Bronwyn Parry, Dean of the College of Arts and Social Sciences
Larissa Behrendt, academic; Professor of Indigenous Research 
Coral Bell, Senior Research Fellow in International Relations
David Bensusan-Butt, economist
Arthur Birch, organic chemist
Boediono, Indonesian Vice President
Richard P. Brent, mathematical scientist
Miroslav Bukovsky, composer
Sydney James Butlin, economist, historian
Chilla Bulbeck, women's studies
Hedley Bull, Professor of International Relations
Harvey Raymond Butcher, astronomer
John Caldwell, demographer
Yang Hi Choe-Wall, Koreanist
Manning Clark, historian
John Coates, mathematician
John Cockcroft, Nobel Prize- winning nuclear physicist, former chancellor
H. C. Coombs, economist and public servant
David P. Craig, research chemist
Gavan Daws, historian and writer
Rafe de Crespigny, sinologist
Robert Dessaix, novelist and essayist
Paul Dibb, Professor of Strategic Studies and Head of the Strategic and Defence Studies Centre
Peter C. Doherty, Nobel Prize-winning immunologist
Thomas K. Donaldson, mathematician
Robert M. Douglas, medical researcher
Sir John Eccles, Nobel Prize-winning neurophysiologist
Fred Emery, social scientist
Kep Enderby, lawyer and politician
Denis Evans, physicist and chemist
Frank Fenner, scientist
C. P. Fitzgerald, historian
Michael Flood, sociologist
Howard Florey, Nobel Prize-winning medical researcher, former chancellor
Derek Freeman, anthropologist
Robert Gilbert, polymer chemist
Peter Godfrey-Smith, philosopher and author of the book Other Minds
Colin Groves, anthropologist
Fred Gruen, economist
Wang Gungwu, specialist in studying the Chinese diaspora
Sir (William) Keith Hancock, historian
Peter Firman Harrison, architect and town planner
Peter Dunstan Hastings, journalist and editor
Anthony F. Hill, in synthetic, organometallic & coordination chemistry
A. D. Hope, poet and essayist
Leonard Huxley, physicist
Ken Inglis, historian
Edward A. Irving, geologist
Zvonimir Janko, mathematician
Frank Lancaster Jones, sociologist
Rhys Jones, archaeologist
James Jupp, political scientist
Peter Karmel, economist
Roger Keesing, anthropologist
Ben Kerkvliet, political scientist
Brij Lal, historian, novelist and writer of non-fiction
Geoffrey Lancaster, musicologist and pianist
Andrew Leigh, economist and federal politician
Ian McAllister, Irish-Australian public opinion political scientist
Gavan McCormack, Orientalist
Helen McGregor, geologist and climate change researcher, a Fellow with the Research School of Earth Sciences
Brendan McKay, computer scientist
Warwick McKibbin, economist
Henry Evans Maude, anthropologist
Achdiat Karta Mihardja, novelist and writer
T. B. Millar, historian and political scientists
John Minford, sinologist and literary translator
Pat Moran, statistician
Fred Nadel, anthropologist
Bernhard Neumann, mathematician
Hanna Neumann, mathematician, first female professor of mathematics in Australia
Cliff Ollier, geologist
Sir Mark Oliphant, physicist and Governor of South Australia
Sarah Pryke, ecologist
Lindsay Pryor, botanist
Leo Radom, research chemist
Anthony Reid, historian of Southeast Asia
James Mahmud Rice, sociologist
Ted Ringwood, geologist
Malcolm Ross, linguist
Amin Saikal, political scientist
Brian P. Schmidt, Nobel Prize winning Physicist
Peter Self, academic
Thomas Smith, economist
Allan Snyder, optical physicist, visual scientist
Oskar Spate, geographer
Trevor Swan, economist
Neil Trudinger, mathematician
Royall Tyler, Japan specialist
Jonathan Unger, contemporary China specialist
Michael Vernon, scientist and consumer activist
Carola Garcia de Vinuesa, Head of the Department of Pathogens and Immunity at the College of Medicine
Ling Wang (Wang Ling), historian of Chinese science
Hugh White, Professor of Strategic Studies and Head of the Strategic and Defence Studies Centre
Jack Waterford, journalist
Anna Wierzbicka, linguist

Philanthropy 

 Phyllis Duguid, teacher, Aboriginal and women's rights advocate.

Administration

Chancellors 

1 Mills served as Chair of the Interim Council while the University was initially beginning operations. While Bruce was officially the first Chancellor, Mills had been effectively fulfilling the same function.

Vice-Chancellors

References 

Australian National University
University